The Pennsylvania State University Creamery, often shortened to just Berkey Creamery or The Creamery, is a producer and vendor of ice cream, sherbet, and cheese, all made through the Department of Food Science in the College of Agricultural Sciences of the Pennsylvania State University. It is the largest university creamery in the United States, using approximately 4.5 million pounds of milk annually, approximately half of which comes from a 225-cow herd at the University's Dairy Production Research Center and the rest from an independent milk producer, and selling 750,000 hand-dipped ice cream cones per year. Offering over 100 ice cream flavors made with a butterfat content of 14.1% and ingredients from around the country and the world, the Creamery's ice cream is enjoyed by many students and alumni every day.

History
The first Creamery was built in 1865, and dairy short courses were first offered in 1892. Ice cream became a part of football weekend tradition in 1896, when Creamery ice cream was first sold to the public. By 1932, the Creamery was buying milk and cream from hundreds of nearby farmers and was selling ice cream in both State College and Altoona, Pennsylvania.

Ice cream makers Ben Cohen and Jerry Greenfield of Ben & Jerry's, are 1978 alumni of the Penn State Creamery correspondence course in ice cream-making, Agriculture 5150, which teaches manufacturers the basics of ice cream production.

During the 1980s the Creamery was using three million pounds of milk per year, and in 2004, it supplied the Penn State dining halls with over 225,000 gallons of milk. That same year, it produced 200,000 pounds of cheese products and 225,000 gallons of ice cream and sherbet, both selling these products and providing them for university use.

Only U.S. President Bill Clinton has been allowed to mix different flavors of Creamery ice cream. The Creamery normally does not allow mixing of flavors (i.e., having scoops of different flavors in one cone / cup).  The flavors President Clinton requested were Cherry Quist and Peachy Paterno.  However, when Clinton returned after his tenure as the President, Creamery workers would no longer serve him mixed flavors.

The Creamery moved from its long-time home in Borland Laboratory location to a new location in the new Food Science Building at the intersection of Curtin Road and Bigler Road in 2006. The new Creamery is closer to Beaver Stadium, the East Residence Halls dormitory complex, and a parking deck. When the move was first announced, there were some student protests, but these protests eventually subsided. 

There are five Creamery ice cream flavors that have remained the most popular in recent Creamery history: Vanilla, Bittersweet Mint, Peanut Butter Swirl, Peachy Paterno, and Butter Pecan.
The new creamery facility has been named the Berkey Creamery, in honor of the Berkey family who donated a large sum of money to the construction of the Food Sciences Building, which includes the new creamery facility.

See also
 List of dairy product companies in the United States

References

External links
Penn State Creamery Home Page
Penn State Department of Food Science
Flavors available at the Penn State Creamery
Penn State College of Agricultural Sciences

Pennsylvania State University campus
Dairy products companies of the United States
Ice cream parlors in the United States
Tourist attractions in Centre County, Pennsylvania